Saeed Rashed (Arabic:سعيد راشد) (born 28 October 1988) is an Emirati footballer. He currently plays for Dibba Al-Hisn as a midfielder .

Career
He formerly played for Al-Fujairah, Dibba Al-Fujairah, Al Urooba, Al Bataeh, and Dibba Al-Hisn.

References

External links
 

1988 births
Living people
Emirati footballers
Fujairah FC players
Dibba FC players
Al Urooba Club players
Al Bataeh Club players
Dibba Al-Hisn Sports Club players
UAE Pro League players
UAE First Division League players
Association football midfielders
Place of birth missing (living people)